Little River is a  long 5th order tributary to the Cape Fear River in North Carolina.  This stream delineates the county boundaries of Moore-Hoke Counties and Harnett-Cumberland Counties for some of its distance.

Variant names
According to the Geographic Names Information System, it has also been known historically as:  
Lower Little River

Course
Little River rises in a pond on the Jackson Creek divide about 0.25 miles north of West End in Moore County, North Carolina.  Little River then flows easterly to meet the Cape Fear River about 2 miles east of Linden in Cumberland and Harnett Counties.

Watershed
Little River drains  of area, receives about 47.1 in/year of precipitation, has a topographic wetness index of 431.94 and is about 47% forested.

See also
List of rivers of North Carolina

References

Rivers of North Carolina
Rivers of Cumberland County, North Carolina
Rivers of Harnett County, North Carolina
Protected areas of Hoke County, North Carolina
Rivers of Moore County, North Carolina
Tributaries of the Cape Fear River